Nuuks Plads station is an underground Copenhagen Metro station located at Nuuks Plads, off Jagtvej, in the Nørrebro district of Copenhagen, Denmark. The station is on the City Circle Line (M3), between Aksel Møllers Have and Nørrebros Runddel, and is in fare zone 2.

History
The station was opened on 29 September 2019 together with 16 other stations of the line.

References

City Circle Line (Copenhagen Metro) stations
Railway stations opened in 2019
2019 establishments in Denmark
Railway stations in Denmark opened in the 21st century